was a feudal domain under the Tokugawa shogunate of Edo period Japan, located in Musashi Province (modern-day Saitama Prefecture), Japan. It was centered on Oshi Castle in what is now part of the city of Gyōda, Saitama.

History
Oshi Castle was completed by Narita Akiyasu around 1479. The Narita family ruled over the area of Gyōda as retainers to the Odawara Hōjō clan. The castle made use of marshes and swamplands in its surroundings and was considered impregnable.  In 1590, Toyotomi Hideyoshi dispatched his senior retainer Ishida Mitsunari with an army of 23,000 troops to seize the castle. In the Siege of Oshi, the castle’s 619 samurai and 2000 local conscripts held off numerous attacks, and the castle surrendered only after word that their overlords had been defeated at the Siege of Odawara.

Afterwards, the area came under the control of Tokugawa Ieyasu, who assigned his 4th son, Matsudaira Tadayoshi to a 100,000 koku domain. However, as Tadayasu was only 11 years old, the domain was managed by Matsudaira Ietada, who repaired the battle-damaged castle and surrounding castle town until 1592. He was replaced by Matsudaira Tadayoshi of the Tōjō-branch of the Matsudaira clan until 1600. However, following the Battle of Sekigahara, Matsudaira Tadayoshi was promoted to Kiyosu Domain (620,000 koku) and Oshi Domain reverted to tenryō status.

The domain was revived in 1633 for the rōjū Matsudaira Nobutsuna, infamous for his role in the suppression of the Shimabara Rebellion. He moved on to Kawagoe Domain in 1638 and was replaced for the next nine generations by the Abe clan.

Abe Tadaaki was a close confidant of shōgun Tokugawa Iemitsu and served as wakadoshiyori and rōjū. His on Masayoshi served as Osaka jōdai and Kyoto Shoshidai, as did many of the succeeding generations at Oshi Domain.  In 1823, Abe Masanori was transferred to Shirakawa Domain, and Oshi was given to Matsudaira Tadataka of the Okudaira branch of the Matsudaira clan, formerly from Kuwana Domain. The Matsudaira continued to rule Oshi until the Meiji Restoration.  Despite their fudai status, Matsudaira Tadakuni united the domain in favor of the Meiji government after shōgun Tokugawa Keiki abandoned his forces (including Tadakuni's son, Masudaira Tadazane)] following the Battle of Toba–Fushimi in the Boshin War. Following the Meiji Restoration, the final daimyō of Oshi Domain, Matsudaira Tadanori, married a daughter of Prince Fushimi Kuniie and was ennobled with the title of viscount (shishaku) in the kazoku peerage.

Holdings at the end of the Edo period
As with most domains in the han system, Oshi Domain consisted of several discontinuous territories calculated to provide the assigned kokudaka, based on periodic cadastral surveys and projected agricultural yields.

Musashi Province
78 villages in Saitama District
6 villages in Adachi District
1 village in Obusuma District
8 villages in Hanzawa District
22 villages in Chichibu District
6 villages in Osato District
9 villages in Hara District
Ise Province
20 villages in Inabe District
35 villages in Asake District
17 villages in Mie District
Harima Province
4 villages in Kako District
7 villages in Taka District
4 villages in Kasai District

List of daimyōs

References

External links
  Oshi on "Edo 300 HTML"

Notes

Domains of Japan
1871 disestablishments in Japan
States and territories disestablished in 1871
Musashi Province
History of Saitama Prefecture
Abe clan
Fukōzu-Matsudaira clan
Matsudaira clan
Ōkōchi-Matsudaira clan
Okudaira-Matsudaira clan